Rémi Laurent (12 October 1957, Suresnes – 14 November 1989, Paris) was a French actor, best known for playing the son Laurent in La Cage aux Folles. He died from an HIV related illness in 1989.

Biography

Laurent was born and raised in the 16th arrondissement of Paris, and was the son of a nursery nurse (his mother) and an agricultural engineer. He learned to play the piano at an early age but decided in his adolescence to pursue comedic acting.

Laurent debuted in the 1976 film À nous les petites Anglaises. He was then featured in a number of popular French films in the late 1970s and most of the 1980s. He is particularly remembered in his role in the film La Cage aux Folles as Laurent, the son of Renato Baldi (Ugo Tognazzi). He also is remembered in his role as Denis Boucher in the québécois film The Plouffe Family (Les Plouffe) directed by Gilles Carle. 

He was romantically involved with actress Anne Caudry, who in turn died of HIV in 1991, then married Emöke Masznyik, a young Hungarian dancer and mime.

He died of an HIV-related illness on 14 November 1989 and is interred at Saint-Pourçain-sur-Sioule.

Filmography

References 
Translated from the French article.

External links
 

1957 births
1989 deaths
People from Suresnes
French male film actors
AIDS-related deaths in France
20th-century French male actors